Opisthjapyx is a genus of diplurans in the family Japygidae.

Species
 Opisthjapyx seurati Silvestri, 1929

References

Diplura